The 40th Guldbagge Awards ceremony, presented by the Swedish Film Institute, honored the best Swedish films of 2004, and took place on 24 January 2005. Dalecarlians directed by Maria Blom was presented with the award for Best Film.

Winner and nominees

Awards

See also
 77th Academy Awards
 62nd Golden Globe Awards
 58th British Academy Film Awards
 11th Screen Actors Guild Awards
 10th Critics' Choice Awards
 25th Golden Raspberry Awards

References

External links
Official website
Guldbaggen on Facebook
Guldbaggen on Twitter

2005 in Sweden
2004 film awards
Guldbagge Awards ceremonies
2000s in Stockholm
January 2005 events in Europe